Martin Alan Fleckman (born April 23, 1944) is an American professional golfer who played on the PGA Tour in the 1960s and 1970s.

Born in Port Arthur, Texas, Fleckman credits Byron Nelson, Carl Lohren, and Jim Hardy with teaching him how to play golf. At the age of 20 in 1964, Fleckman won the individual title at the Texas State Amateur. In 1965, he won the NCAA Championship while at the University of Houston, where he was a three-time All-American member of the golf team: third-team in 1964, first-team in 1965 and 1966. He competed for the United States in Israel in the 1965 Maccabiah Games. He was a member of the Walker Cup team in 1967.

While still an amateur, Fleckman played in the U.S. Open at Baltusrol in 1967. He led after the first and third rounds, but shot  on Sunday amid a surge by eventual champion Jack Nicklaus. The last amateur to lead the U.S. Open at 54 holes was Johnny Goodman, 34 years earlier in 1933. (Seven years earlier in 1960, Nicklaus led as an amateur during the final round.) Fleckman finished in a tie for 18th place and was the low amateur, a stroke ahead of Bob Murphy, who shot 69 in the final round.

In his first start on the PGA Tour in December 1967, Fleckman won the Cajun Classic Open Invitational in a playoff. At Oakbourne Country Club in Lafayette, Louisiana, he sank a  birdie putt on the first extra hole to defeat Jack Montgomery and take the winner's share of $5,000. It was his third consecutive birdie, finishing regulation play with two. Fleckman is only one of five other players to win his first tour event as a professional, and has since been joined by Ben Crenshaw (1973), Robert Gamez (1990), Garrett Willis (2001), and Russell Henley (2013). This was to be his only Tour title. His best finish in a major was a tie for fourth at the PGA Championship in 1968.

Fleckman was inducted into the Texas Golf Hall of Fame in 1986, and into the University of Houston Hall of Honor in 2006. He also received the prestigious 2007 Teacher of the Year Award for the Southern Texas Section of the PGA. He currently works as director of golf instruction at Blackhorse Teaching Center in Texas.

Amateur wins (4)
1964 Texas State Amateur
1965 NCAA Championship
1966 Eastern Amateur
1967 Northeast Amateur

Professional wins (1)

PGA Tour wins (1)

PGA Tour playoff record (1–0)

Results in major championships

Note: Fleckman never played in The Open Championship.

LA = Low amateur
CUT = missed the half-way cut
WD = withdrew
"T" = tied

Team appearances
Amateur
Walker Cup: 1967 (winners)

See also 

 1967 PGA Tour Qualifying School graduates

References

External links

Texas Golf Hall of Fame – Marty Fleckman

American male golfers
PGA Tour golfers
Houston Cougars men's golfers
Golfers from Texas
American golf instructors
Competitors at the 1965 Maccabiah Games
Maccabiah Games competitors for the United States
Sportspeople from Port Arthur, Texas
1944 births
Living people